The 2022 Asian Women's Handball Championship was the 19th edition of the Asian Women's Handball Championship, which took place from 24 November to 4 December 2022 in South Korea. The tournament was held under the aegis of Asian Handball Federation and acted as the Asian qualifying tournament for the 2023 World Women's Handball Championship, with the top five teams qualifying. If countries from Oceania (Australia or New Zealand) participating in the Asian Championships finished in the top 5, they would have qualified for the World Championships. However, as Australia finished in tenth place, the place was transferred to the wild card spot.

South Korea defeated Japan in the final to win their 16th title.

Draw
The draw was held in Bahrain on 27 August 2022.

Seeding

Venues

Preliminary round
All times are local (UTC+9).

Group A

Group B

Knockout stage

Ninth place game

5–8th place bracket

5–8th place semifinals

Seventh place game

Fifth place game

Championship bracket

Semifinals

Third place game

Final

Final standing

All-Star team

References

External links
AHF website

2022
2022 in women's handball
Sports competitions in Incheon
Sports competitions in Seoul
International handball competitions hosted by South Korea
Asian Women's Handball Championship
Asian Women's Handball Championship
2022 in Asian women's sport
Asian Women's